Avinash Wadhawan is an Indian film and television actor. He has appeared in films like, Junoon, Geet and Balmaa. He played in Colors TV show Balika Vadhu'' as Anup Shekhar.

Filmography

Films

Television

Web series

References

External links 
 

1964 births
Living people
Indian male soap opera actors
Male actors in Hindi cinema
Place of birth missing (living people)